Toumba Stadium is a football stadium in Thessaloniki, Greece. It is property of AC PAOK. The official name of the stadium is simply PAOK Stadium, but through the years it has become synonymous with the borough it is built at, the borough of Toumba.

History

The construction started in 1958 and completed in 1959. Patrons on the project were the Ministry of Culture and Sport (Greece) which offered the amount of 1,100,000 drachmas, while the Hellenic National Defence General Staff owned the space and contributed decisively to expropriate it for the stadium.

The then defense minister Georgios Themelis vouched for the expropriation of the area of Toumba Stadium during the Konstantinos Karamanlis government in 1958. The architect of the project was Minas Trempelas and the engineer was Antonis Trigliano. The inauguration event was scheduled for Sunday 6 September 1959 with a friendly encounter against AEK FC.

The stadium is located in the district of Toumba in eastern Thessaloniki. Its original capacity was 45,000 until the installation of seating on all stands in 1998, which reduced the capacity to 32,000 (seated). The introduction of security zones in 2000 further reduced the capacity to the current capacity of 29,000 seats. A record attendance of 45,252 has been recorded in a 1st division football match between PAOK and AEK on 19 December 1976. The stadium's official name is simply "PAOK Stadium", however it is commonly referred to as "Toumba" after the district where is located.

Toumba Stadium is infamous for its hostile atmosphere, a factor that led to the attribution of the Stadium as 'The Black Hell'. On high-profile encounters, when the players walk out of the tunnel, the song Hells Bells by AC/DC is heard from the stadium's speakers.

2004 upgrade
The stadium has hosted several games of the Greece national football team. The stadium was selected as one of the training venues for the football tournaments of the 2004 Olympic Games, and due to this it was heavily upgraded. The relevant works commenced in 2003 and the stadium was again ready to be used in the summer of 2004 while boasting a brand new look. The most important modification was the construction of a new four-storey building behind the main west stand (Gates 1, 2 and 3). The new building of the stadium houses a number of VIP boxes and VIP lounges, service areas for TV and the press and new club offices. A new roof was also installed over the west stand, while other works included new seats, upgrades for the dressing rooms, a new pitch and re-enforcement of the concrete pillars below the north curved stand (Gate 4 and Gate 4A).

Recent upgrades
After the advent of the new major shareholder Ivan Savvidis in 2012, a gradual renovation began. Big changes began in 2012–13, but most of the changes were made in 2014–15 for the European obligations of PAOK in the UEFA Europa League, starting from the central part of the stadium. A presidential suite was created and a gradual renovation for the media theories for convenience and functionality in the building of the third floor. In early September 2015, the turf was changed.

New Stadium
PAOK administration have already presented to the Greek public authorities an architecture study of a new Stadium at Toumba. The Greek Council of State (CoS), the country’s supreme court, in April 2022 approved a proposal to setup the complete redevelopment of Toumba Stadium, with the CoS deeming legal a draft Presidential Decree concerning the approval of a Special Urban Plan for the district of Toumba, where the venue is located. On 21 June 2022, PAOK has formalized the beginning of a collaboration with a team consisting of domestic engineering and consulting firm SALFO and global architectural design company Populous to deliver the project. It is estimated that PAOK will be granted a building permit in 2023 and the new stadium will be completed by 2026 and will have a capacity of 41,900 spectators. PAOK would probably move to Kaftanzoglio Stadium until the new Stadium is built.

Gallery

See also
P.A.O.K.
PAOK FC

References

External links
 Toumba Stadium at PAOK FC official website
 Toumba Stadium at stadia.gr
 Toumba Stadium

PAOK
Football venues in Greece
Sports venues in Thessaloniki
Tourist attractions in Thessaloniki